Moishe's Moving Systems is a moving company that offers local and long distance moving services, self-storage, and mobile storage.  Moishe's is the first "green" moving company on the East Coast.
 By 1990, it had become the largest independent moving company in New York City. By 1995, they were the largest in the entire tri-state area. In a widely reported New York City "Rags to Riches" story, Moishe Mana began as a “man with a van.”  Today, Moishe’s Moving owns a conglomerate of 15 companies.

Moishe Mana’s company and story have been featured on NBC’s Today Show, New York Magazine, The Daily News, Newsday, The NY Times, The New York Post, Arsenio Hall Show, Sally Jesse Raphael Show and Good Day New York.

See also
Mana Contemporary

References

External links
Official Website

Moving companies of the United States
Companies based in New York City